Trinchero is a surname. Notable people with the surname include: 

Daniele Trinchero (born 1968), Italian engineer and inventor
Luigi Trinchero (1862–1944), Italian sculptor active in Argentina
Serge Trinchero (born 1949), Swiss/Italian footballer